Octavia Fry Rogan (October 18, 1886 – March 1973) was an American librarian. She served as state librarian and president of the Texas Library Association.

References

1886 births
1973 deaths
American librarians
American women librarians